US Sports Camps (USSC) manages hundreds of youth sports camps, located in the United States and internationally. The company, based in San Rafael, California, encompasses the largest network of sports camps in the nation.

History
The company was founded in 1975 by Charlie Hoeveler and Bill Closs. Billie Jean King, her coach Dennis Van der Meer, and Closs provided the initial capital, though Closs bought out the other two partners within a year. Shortly after, Hoeveler gained major ownership interest.

Camp structure
Children ages 7–18 attend one and two-week camps, receiving intensive training in a single sport. The camps focus on nearly two dozen sports. Most camps are held during the summer on college campuses.

Camp directors, usually head coaches from host colleges, remain in charge of the camp expenses, facility rentals, and the hiring of camp staff. The directors receive incentive-based compensation. USSC handles marketing and administration of the camps.

Sponsorship
After carrying Adidas sponsorship during its early years, the company switched to Nike sponsorship in 1994, and now about 70 percent of the camps carry the Nike name. Nike provides clothing and equipment for the camps, while USSC retains ownership and management of the camps.

Advertising and revenue
During 2015 more than 75,000 US and international campers attended a USSC program. As of 2012, annual revenues were near $30 million.
Advertising techniques the company uses include ads in youth and sports-specific publications as well as major newspapers in addition to targeted direct-mail campaigns.

In 1998 USSC invested $80,000 to create an interactive website, allowing for online camp registration. The site garnered over a million dollars in revenue in one year. It led to a 20 percent increase in business with 20 percent lower office staffing requirements.

References

Companies based in San Rafael, California